Arthur Reginald Edwards (4 June 1934 – 18 May 2006) was an Australian rules footballer in the Victorian Football League.

Debuting in 1951 with the Footscray Football Club soon after he turned 17, Edwards stood at 185 cm tall and was a fine ruckman in a period when the club had such tall men as Dave Bryden. Noted for his ruckwork and strong marking skills, Edwards rested in the backline. His career highlight was playing in the Bulldogs' 1954 premiership side.

Four consecutive generations, namely his father in law Frank "Dolly" Aked (Footscray), his son Allan Edwards (Richmond, Collingwood and Footscray) and two grandsons Jake Edwards (Carlton) and Shane O'Bree (Brisbane and Collingwood) have all played at the elite level of AFL/VFL football.

References

External links

Western Bulldogs players
Western Bulldogs Premiership players
Australian rules footballers from Victoria (Australia)
1934 births
2006 deaths
One-time VFL/AFL Premiership players